Some Runner is a 1913 silent film short directed by Al Christie with Eddie Lyons and Lee Moran. It was released as a split-reel with When Cupid Won.

Cast
Eddie Lyons - Marathon Runner
Lee Moran
Ramona Langley

References

External links
 Some Runner at IMDb.com

1913 films
American silent short films
American black-and-white films
Films directed by Al Christie
Universal Pictures short films
1910s American films